Gainesway Farm is an American Thoroughbred horse breeding business in Lexington, Kentucky. It was originally called Greentree Farms.

The 1,500 acre (6 km²) property has been home to stallions such as Youth and Exceller and numerous others who are buried on the property.  Among the current stallion roster is Tapit, sire of 4 Breeders' Cup winners since 2008 and 2013 Leading U.S.-based Yearling Sire.

In 1995, under the name Gainesway Stable, owner Graham Beck partnered with Robert and Beverly Lewis and William T. Young of Overbrook Farm in the ownership and racing of Timber Country who won the 1994 Breeders' Cup Juvenile and 1995 Preakness Stakes.

Stallions

Gainesway is home to the following stallions:

Historic stallions
Vaguely Noble (1965–1989)
Blushing Groom (1974–1992)
Cannonade (1971–1993)
Riverman (1969–1999)
Irish River (1976–2004)
Lyphard (1969–2005)
Cozzene (1980–2008)
Broad Brush (1983-2009)
Mt. Livermore (1981-2010)
Mr. Greeley (1992–2010)
Hat Trick(Jpn 2012-2017)

History

The Farm was formed by John R. Gaines, considered the founder of the Breeders Cup.  Originally located off Tates Creek Pike in Lexington, this property was sold for development, and the thoroughbred division of Gainesway Farm, under the ownership of John R. Gaines, was moved to the present location on Paris Pike in Lexington.

In 1989, Gainesway Farm was sold to South African horseman Graham J. Beck, whose acquisition included what was once the Cornelius Vanderbilt Whitney farm properties established in 1915 by Harry Payne Whitney, plus the parcel belonging to Payne Whitney's Greentree Stud.

Notable managers

One of the managers of Gainesway Farm was Joseph Lannon Taylor.  He began his career in the horse industry as the farm manager at Gainesway Farm, where he raised many world-class standardbreds and thoroughbreds and was influential in developing Gainesway Farm.  During his time there, Taylor saw six Gainesway stallions lead the world's sire list, the American sire list, or the European sire list: Bold Bidder, Vaguely Noble, Lyphard, Blushing Groom, Riverman, and Sharpen Up. After managing at Gainesway for 40 years, he retired in 1990.

Burial site

The C. V. Whitney Farm, which is now part of Gainesway, is the final resting place of several champion thoroughbreds. Some of the Whitney/Gainesway horses buried here include:

Arts and Letters (1966–1998)
Bimelech (1937–1966)
Blushing Groom (1974–1992)
Bold Bidder (1962–1982)
Broomstick (1901–1931)
Cannonade (1971–1993)
Capot (1946–1974)
Counterpoint (1948–1969)
Equipoise (1928–1938)
Irish River (1976–2004)
Key to the Mint (1969–1996)
La Troienne (1926–1954)
Lyphard (1969–2005)

Mahmoud (1933–1962)
Peter Pan (1904–1933)
Regret (1912–1934)
Riverman (1969–1999)
Shut Out (1939–1964)
Silver Spoon (1956–1978)
St Germans (1921–1947)
Stage Door Johnny (1965–1996)
Tom Fool (1949–1976)
Top Flight (1929–1949)
Twenty Grand (1928–1948)
Vaguely Noble (1965–1989)
Whisk Broom II (1907–1928)
Winning Colors (1985–2008)

Arboretum

Gainesway Farm has also been designated as a Level II arboretum by ArbNet. The farm has over 1,500 acres (6 km²) of decorative plants, floral displays, and tree collections that are nurtured by a full-time horticulture staff.  Of particular note are the more than 45 different kinds of oaks, including a California Valley Oak and an Oglethorpe, that have been planted.

2007 sales

At the Saratoga Yearling sales in August, Gainesway had a sales topper with a chestnut Mr. Greeley colt that sold for $2.2 million to Team Valor and will be syndicated.  The colt has been named Kinsella after well-known baseball writer W. P. Kinsella, whose book, Shoeless Joe, was adapted into the movie Field of Dreams.

References

External links
 
 TB Heritage Grave Matters Whitney
 NTRA Gainesway Farm Stats
 Saratoga Yearling Topper

American racehorse owners and breeders
Buildings and structures in Lexington, Kentucky
Horse farms in Kentucky